Jac Collinsworth (born February 13, 1995) is an American sportscaster working for NBC Sports since 2020. He also worked for ESPN on their NFL Live and Sunday NFL Countdown. At NBC, Collinsworth serves as a play-by-play announcer for the USFL, Notre Dame Football on NBC and Atlantic 10 Conference men's basketball. Additionally, he co-hosts NBC's Football Night in America.

Early life and education
Collinsworth was born in Fort Thomas, Kentucky on February 13, 1995. He is the son of former NFL wide receiver and current NBC Sports commentator Cris Collinsworth. Collinsworth attended Highlands High School and played on the football team. However, a back injury sidetracked him from playing football in college.

As a high school student, Collinsworth first got involved with broadcasting by recording, editing and producing videos. Collinsworth attended the University of Notre Dame, graduating in 2017. While a student there, he founded and hosted ND Live, a digital series covering the Notre Dame football team. He also covered Notre Dame's pro day for NFL Network in 2016 and 2017.

Career

First stint at NBC (2013–2017)
As a student at Notre Dame, Collinsworth worked for NBC on their sideline production team for Notre Dame football from 2013 until 2017. In 2016 and 2017, he served as a sideline reporter for NBC's production of Notre Dame's  Blue-Gold spring football game. Collinsworth served as NBC's social media correspondent at the 2016 Rio Olympics.

ESPN (2017–2020)
Following his work at NBC while a student at Notre Dame, Collinsworth began working at ESPN in 2017. He started off as a features reporter for Sunday NFL Countdown and in 2018 started hosting NFL Live during the NFL offseason. He also hosted the ACC Network's premier football show The Huddle.

Second stint at NBC (2020–present)
After three years at ESPN, Collinsworth returned to NBC in 2020. At NBC, Collinsworth serves as the co-host of Football Night in America. He served as the host for the pre and post-game show for Notre Dame Football on NBC. Collinsworth is also a pre and post-race studio host for NASCAR on NBC. He serves as the play-by-play announcer for Atlantic 10 Conference men's basketball and is the voice of the Atlantic 10 men's basketball tournament.

In 2021, Collinsworth served as a reporter for NBC's coverage of the Kentucky Derby, pre-race host of the Indianapolis 500 and an on-site contributor for the 2020 Tokyo Summer Olympics on Peacock.

Collinsworth made his Super Bowl debut in 2022 as the co-host of the Super Bowl LVI Pregame Show. Later that year, Collinsworth served as a play-by-play announcer for NBC's coverage of the USFL. Additionally, Collinsworth was promoted to play-by-play voice of Notre Dame football for the 2022 season

References

1995 births
Living people
American horse racing announcers
American television sports announcers
Association football commentators
College basketball announcers in the United States
College football announcers
National Football League announcers
Notre Dame Fighting Irish football announcers
Olympic Games broadcasters
University of Notre Dame alumni
Sportspeople from Kentucky
Motorsport announcers
NBC Sports
People from Fort Thomas, Kentucky